The 1975 First National Bank Classic, also known as the Atlanta WCT, was a men's tennis tournament played on indoor carpet courts at the Alexander Memorial Coliseum in Atlanta, Georgia in the United States that was part of the Red Group of the 1975 World Championship Tennis circuit. It was the fourth edition of the tournament and was held from March 24 through March 30, 1975. Fifth-seeded Mark Cox won the singles title and the accompanying $12,000 first-prize money

Finals

Singles
 Mark Cox defeated  John Alexander 6–3, 7–6(7–3)
 It was Cox's 3rd singles title of the year and the 17th of his career in the Open Era.

Doubles
 Vijay Amritraj /  Ashok Amritraj defeated  Mark Cox /  Cliff Drysdale 6–3, 6–2

References

External links
 ITF tournament edition details

Peachtree Corners Classic
Peachtree Corners Classic